Trimeresurus truongsonensis is a venomous pitviper species endemic to Vietnam. Its common names are Truong Son pit viper and Quang Binh pitviper.

Geographic range
This species is known with certainty only from the Phong Nha-Ke Bang National Park, Quang Binh province, in the Annamite Mountains of central Vietnam.

Habitat
These secretive snakes are mostly seen when basking following strong rains.

Reproduction
Trimeresurus truongsonensis is viviparous.

References

truongsonensis
Endemic fauna of Vietnam
Reptiles described in 2004
Snakes of Vietnam